Ravil Kamilevich Mingazov is a citizen of Russia who was held in extrajudicial detention for almost fifteen years in the United States's Guantanamo Bay detention camps, in Cuba.
The Department of Defense reports that Mingazov was born on December 5, 1967, in Bolsheretski, Russia.

Ravil Mingazov arrived at Guantanamo on October 28, 2002, and 

Mingazov, an ethnic Tatar, was a ballet dancer, before he joined the Soviet army.
Anti-Muslim harassment drove Mingazov to leave Russia for Tajikistan, in 2000.

Mingazov was approved for transfer on July 21, 2016. He was transferred to the United Arab Emirates on January 19, 2017.

Official status reviews

Office for the Administrative Review of Detained Enemy Combatants

Scholars at the Brookings Institution, led by Benjamin Wittes, listed the captives still
held in Guantanamo in December 2008, according to whether their detention was justified by certain
common allegations:

 Ravil Mingazov  was listed as one of the captives who "The military alleges ... are associated with Al Qaeda."
 Ravil Mingazov  was listed as one of the captives who "The military alleges ... stayed in Al Qaeda, Taliban or other guest- or safehouses."
 Ravil Mingazov  was listed as one of the captives who "The military alleges ... took military or terrorist training in Afghanistan."
 Ravil Mingazov  was listed as one of the captives who "The military alleges that the following detainees were captured under circumstances that strongly suggest belligerency."
 Ravil Mingazov  was listed as one of the captives who was an "al Qaeda operative".
 Ravil Mingazov  was listed as one of the "34 [captives] admit to some lesser measure of affiliation—like staying in Taliban or Al Qaeda guesthouses or spending time at one of their training camps."
 Ravil Mingazov  was listed as one of the captives who had "stayed at Taliban or Al Qaeda guesthouses."
 Ravil Mingazov was listed as one of the captives who had admitted "some form of associational conduct."

Writ of habeas corpus
On May 13, 2010, US District Court Judge Henry H. Kennedy, Jr.,  the Obama administration to release Mingazov under the writ of habeas corpus.
Mingazov's was the 35 case where the judge ordered a release.  The government had succeeded in convincing a habeas corpus judge continued detention was justified in an additional 13 cases.

A panel of judges on the Washington DC court of appeals reversed Kennedy's release order.

Formerly secret JTF-GTMO assessment
On April 25, 2011, the whistleblower organization WikiLeaks published formerly secret assessments prepared by Joint Task Force Guantanamo. 
Ravil’s assessment was nine pages and recommended continued detention under DoD Control.
It was signed by camp commandant Mark H. Buzby.

Guantanamo Joint Task Force Review
On January 20, 2009, newly inaugurated President Barack Obama issued several Presidential Executive Orders  related to the Guantanamo detention center – which he had promised to close during his presidential campaign.  Those Executive Orders set up a Guantanamo Review Task Force, intended to replace OARDEC.
In October 2013, Freedom of Information Act requests submitted by Carol Rosenberg and her colleagues at the Miami Herald triggered the publication of a list of "final dispositions".
According to that list Ravil Mingazov should be "referred for prosecution".

Repatriation discussions
Russian officials are scheduled to travel to Guantanamo on January 17, 2014, to meet with Mingazov.
According to the Moscow Times, visiting Russian officials had been turned away in April 2013, because Mingazov had declined to meet with them.

Asylum in the United Kingdom
On November 6, 2015, The Guardian reported that Mingazov's teenage son and his former wife now live in the United Kingdom, and that his family had filed an asylum application on his behalf.
His son and former wife arrived in the UK in 2014, and live with other relatives of Mingazov there.

Transfer to the United Arab Emirates
Mingazov was one of the last four individuals to be transferred from Guantanamo before the end of Barack Obama's Presidency.  Mingazov, an Afghan, Wali Mohammed, and a Yemeni, Yassim Qasim Mohammed Ismail Qasim, were transferred to the United Arab Emirates, while Jabran al-Qahtani was repatriated to Saudi Arabia, on January 19, 2017, just one day prior to Donald Trump's inauguration. Trump had promised to curtail all transfers from Guantanamo.

References

External links
Judge Orders Release from Guantánamo of Russian Caught in Abu Zubaydah’s Web Andy Worthington May 19, 2010
 Two Massachusetts Towns Welcome Guantánamo Detainee Ordered Released by a Federal Judge Common Dreams NewsCenter May 14, 2010
 Guantanamo Prisoner's Mother Says Son Fears Returning To Russia Radio Free Europe May 18, 2010
Human Rights First; Habeas Works: Federal Courts’ Proven Capacity to Handle Guantánamo Cases (2010)

Living people
Detainees of the Guantanamo Bay detention camp
Russian extrajudicial prisoners of the United States
Tatar people of Russia
1967 births